Star Falls is an American comedy television series created by George Doty IV that aired on Nickelodeon from March 31 to July 28, 2018, and on TeenNick from August 5 to September 2, 2018. The series stars Siena Agudong, Kamaia Fairburn, Elena V. Wolfe, Dion Johnstone, Jadiel Dowlin, and Marcus Cornwall.

Premise 
Craig Brooks is a popular Hollywood actor, and the father of Diamond, Phoenix, and Bo Brooks. For his latest movie role, he temporarily moves his family to the town of Star Falls, where his movie is being filmed. While there, Diamond Brooks befriends a local girl, Sophia Miller. Sophia and Diamond team up to set their parents up with each other.

Cast

Main 
 Siena Agudong as Sophia Miller
 Kamaia Fairburn as Diamond Brooks
 Elena V. Wolfe as Beth
 Dion Johnstone as Craig
 Jadiel Dowlin as Phoenix Brooks
 Marcus Cornwall as Bo Brooks

Recurring 
 Tomaso Sanelli as Nate
 Shawn Lawrence as Lou
 Liz Johnston as Ginger

Production 
The series from Breakthrough Entertainment was green-lit with a 20-episode order on November 13, 2017.

Broadcast and release 
Star Falls premiered on Nickelodeon on March 31, 2018. The first two episodes of the series were made available on the Nickelodeon website with no login required, and on the Nick app, on March 9, 2018.

Broadcast of the series moved to TeenNick on August 5, 2018, starting with the twelfth episode.

Ratings 
 
}}

Episodes

References

External links 
 

2010s American children's comedy television series
2010s Nickelodeon original programming
2018 American television series debuts
2018 American television series endings
English-language television shows
Television series by Corus Entertainment
Television shows filmed in Toronto